PGIC may refer to:

 Patient global impression of change, a measure of effectiveness used in medical studies, such as for testing the effectiveness of gabapentin
 Progressive Gaming International Corporation, a defunct casino game-making company previously known as Mikohn Gaming that went bankrupt in 2009
 Undecaprenyl phosphate N,N'-diacetylbacillosamine 1-phosphate transferase, a.k.a. PglC, with the letter 'l' (lowercase of 'L') mistaken for the leter 'I' (uppercase of 'i')